Aradhana  or Aaradhana is a Tami] word meaning an act of glorifying God or worship. It may refer to:

Films
Aradhana (1962 film), directed by V. Madhusudhan Rao and starring Akkineni Nageswara Rao and Savitri
Aradhana (1969 film), by Shakti Samanta, starring Rajesh Khanna and Sharmila Tagore
Aradhana (1976 film), starring N. T. Rama Rao
Aradhana (1977 film), by Madhu
Aradhana (1981 film), a 1981 Sri Lankan film directed by Vijaya Dharma 
Aradhana (1987 film), by Bharathiraja, starring Chiranjeevi and Suhasini

People with the given name
Aradhana Misra (born 1974), Indian politician

See also

Aaradhna (born 1983), New Zealand R&B singer
Aradhna, an Indian spiritual band from Cincinnati, USA